Afrodon is an extinct genus of eutherians in the family Adapisoriculidae. Its type species is Afrodon chleuhi, known from the late Palaeocene of Morocco. The other known species are Afrodon germanicus from the late Palaeocene of Germany and France, Afrodon tagourtensis from the early Eocene of Morocco, Afrodon ivani from the late Palaeocene of Spain, and Afrodon gheerbranti from the early Paleocene of Belgium. Its range spread from the Cernaysian to the Grauvian in the European land mammal ages.

Distribution 
Fossils of Afrodon have been found in:
Paleocene
 Hainin Formation, Belgium
 Cernay Formation, France
 Tremp Formation, Spain
 Jbel Guersif Formation, Morocco

Eocene
 Aït Ouarhitane Formation, Morocco

References 

Prehistoric eutherians
Eocene mammals of Europe
Paleocene mammals of Europe
Paleogene Belgium
Fossils of Belgium
Paleogene France
Fossils of France
Paleogene Spain
Fossils of Spain
Tremp Formation
Paleocene mammals of Africa
Fossils of Morocco
Fossil taxa described in 1988
Prehistoric mammal genera